Oswald George Nelson (March 20, 1906 – June 3, 1975) was an American actor, filmmaker, musician and bandleader. He originated and starred in The Adventures of Ozzie and Harriet, a radio and television series with his wife Harriet and two sons David and Ricky Nelson.

Early life
Nelson was born March 20, 1906 in Jersey City, New Jersey, United States. He was the second son of Ethel Irene (née Orr) and George Waldemar Nelson. His paternal grandparents were Swedish and his mother was of English descent. Nelson was raised in Ridgefield Park where he was active in Scouting, earning the rank of Eagle Scout at age 13. He played football at Ridgefield Park High School as well as during his college years at Rutgers University. He was a member of the Cap and Skull fraternity. He graduated from Rutgers University with a bachelor's degree and earned a law degree from Rutgers School of Law, Newark, New Jersey, in 1930. Nelson was made a doctor of humane letters by Rutgers University in 1957. As a student he made pocket money playing saxophone in a band and coaching football. Nelson was rejected to be the vocalist for the Rutgers Jazz Bandits, led by Scrappy Lambert and later Hawley Ades. Nelson was not discouraged and was gracious about this rejection when he met Ades years later. During the Depression, he turned to music as a full-time career.

Career

Music

Nelson started his entertainment career as a band leader. He formed and led The Ozzie Nelson Band, and had some initial limited success. Nelson made his own "big break" in 1930, when The New York Daily Mirror ran a poll of its readers to determine their favorite band. Since he knew that news vendors got credit from the newspaper for unsold copies by returning the front page and discarding the rest of the issue, he cannily had his band's members gather hundreds of discarded newspapers and fill out ballots in their own favor. They edged out Paul Whiteman and were pronounced the winners.

From 1930 through the 1940s, Nelson's band recorded prolifically—first on Brunswick (1930–1933), then Vocalion (1933–1934), then back to Brunswick (1934–1936), Bluebird (1937–1941), Victor (1941), and finally back to Bluebird (1941 through the 1940s). Nelson's records were consistently popular, and in 1934, Nelson enjoyed success with his hit song, "Over Somebody Else's Shoulder," which he introduced. Nelson’s primary vocalist was Rose Anne Stevens, who appeared in the 1942 movie Down Rio Grande Way and Tomorrow We Live. Later in his big band career, Harriet Hilliard replaced Stevens, after the latter's marriage to Colonel Weller. Nelson's calm, easy vocal style was popular on records and radio and quite similar to son Rick's voice, Eric Hilliard ("Ricky") and Harriet's perky vocals added to the band's popularity.

In 1935, "Ozzie Nelson and His Orchestra," as they were being called, had a number one hit with "And Then Some", which was number one for one week on the U.S. pop singles chart. Nelson wrote and composed several songs, including "Wave the Stick Blues", "Subway", "Jersey Jive", "Swingin' on the Golden Gate", and "Central Avenue Shuffle".

In October 1935, he married the band's vocalist Harriet Hilliard. The couple had two children: the older, David (1936–2011), became an actor and director, and the younger, Eric Hilliard ("Ricky") (1940–1985), became an actor and singer.

Films

Ozzie Nelson appeared with his band in feature films and short subjects of the 1940s, and often played speaking parts, displaying a tongue-in-cheek sense of humor, as in the 1942 musical Strictly in the Groove. He shrewdly promoted the band by agreeing to appear in "soundies," three-minute musical movies shown in "film jukeboxes" of the 1940s. In 1952, when he and his family were established as radio and TV favorites, they starred in a feature film, Here Come the Nelsons, which served as the "pilot" for the TV series.

Radio and television
In the 1940s, Nelson began to look for a way to spend more time with his family, especially his growing sons. Besides band appearances, he and Harriet had been regulars on The Raleigh Cigarette Program, Red Skelton's radio show. Nelson developed and produced his own radio series, The Adventures of Ozzie and Harriet. The show originally aired in 1944, with their sons played by actors until 1949. In 1952 it moved to television, where David and Ricky appeared on camera. The radio version continued for another two years, and the last television episode aired in 1966.

The TV show starred the entire family, as America watched Ozzie and Harriet raise their boys. Nelson was producer and director of most of the episodes, and he co-wrote many of them. Nelson's brother, Don Nelson, was also one of the writers.  Ozzie was hands on, involved with every aspect of both radio and TV programs. It is notable that throughout the 1950's, Ozzie's prior bandleading career and Harriet's singing, acting, and dancing careers were seldom mentioned. The younger audience would have had no idea that Ozzie and Harriet had previously been involved in music.

Nelson appeared as a guest panelist on the June 9, 1957, episode of What's My Line?

His last television show, in the fall of 1973, was Ozzie's Girls, which lasted for a year in first-run syndication. The premise involved Ozzie and Harriet renting their sons' former room to two college girls—actresses Brenda Sykes and Susan Sennett—and portrayed the Nelsons' efforts at adjusting to living with two young women after raising two sons.

For his contribution to the television industry, Ozzie Nelson has a star on the Hollywood Walk of Fame at 6555 Hollywood Boulevard. He has an additional star with his wife at 6260 Hollywood Boulevard for their contribution to radio.

Personal life

He married band singer Harriet Hilliard in 1935. They had two sons, David (born in 1936) and Eric (known as Ricky, born in 1940). The couple remained married until Ozzie's death in 1975. His grandchildren include actress Tracy Nelson and musicians Matthew and Gunnar Nelson. He was also the former father-in-law of Kristin Harmon and June Blair.

Cultural historians have noted that the on-screen laid-back character was very different from the real-life Ozzie Nelson, who has been characterized as an authoritarian figure who monitored every aspect of his children's lives. In 1998, A&E broadcast a documentary entitled Ozzie and Harriet: The Adventures of America's Favorite Family, which depicted Ozzie Nelson as a dictatorial personality who "thwarted his sons, preventing them from attending college and reminding them that they were obliged to work on television". Author David Halberstam has written, "the Nelsons arguably were a dysfunctional family. In real life, Ozzie was a workaholic who stole his sons' childhood (by having them grow up in show business)".

In 1973, Ozzie Nelson published his autobiography, Ozzie, (Prentice Hall, 1973).

Death
Nelson suffered from recurring malignant tumors in his later years, and eventually succumbed to liver cancer. He died at his home in the San Fernando Valley on June 3, 1975, with his wife and sons at his bedside.

Services were held at the Church of the Hills at Forest Lawn, Hollywood Hills, California on Friday, June 6. He is interred with his wife and son Ricky in the Forest Lawn – Hollywood Hills Cemetery in Los Angeles, California.

When his elder son David died in 2011, he was cremated, having chosen a niche in Westwood Memorial Park's outdoor Garden of Serenity columbarium rather than interment in the Nelson family plot.

Selected filmography

References

External links

 Ozzie Nelson recordings at the Discography of American Historical Recordings.

Museum of Broadcast Communications: Ozzie and Harriet Nelson (archived)
 
The Ozzie and Harriet Nelson Papers, at the University of Wyoming - American Heritage Center

1906 births
1975 deaths
20th-century American male actors
American male film actors
American male radio actors
American male television actors
American people of English descent
American people of Swedish descent
American television directors
Big band bandleaders
Burials at Forest Lawn Memorial Park (Hollywood Hills)
Deaths from cancer in California
Deaths from liver cancer
Male actors from Jersey City, New Jersey
People from Ridgefield Park, New Jersey
Players of American football from Jersey City, New Jersey
Ridgefield Park High School alumni
Rutgers Scarlet Knights football players
Rutgers School of Law–Newark alumni
Rutgers University alumni
Swing saxophonists
20th-century American businesspeople
Film directors from New Jersey
20th-century saxophonists
Television producers from New Jersey